Alastair Chalmers (born 31 March 2000) is a British track and field hurdler who specialises in the 400 metres hurdles. The Guernsey record-holder for the 400 metres hurdles, Chalmers currently competes for both Guernsey and Great Britain. In addition to multiple Island Games medals, Chalmers is the 2017 Commonwealth Youth Champion. In 2022 Chalmers became British 400m Hurdles Champion for the third successive year.

In June 2020, Chalmers rose to 4th on the British all time list and 24th on the worldwide all time list for 300 metres hurdles. He became British champion when winning the 400 metres hurdles event at the 2020 British Athletics Championships in a time of 49.66 secs. Chalmers followed this up by winning again in 2021 and 2022. He improved his personal best to 48.88s in Oordegem, Belgium in May 2022, placing him 12th All-Time in Great Britain for senior 400m hurdles.
In July 2022 he reached the semi final of the World Athletics Championships in Eugene, Oregon, USA.
The highlight of his season came on Saturday 6th August at the Commonwealth Games in Birmingham, England. Chalmers won the Bronze Medal in the 400m Hurdles, the first ever track and field medal for Guernsey in the history of the Commonwealth Games.

References

External links
 
 
 
 

2000 births
Living people
Guernsey male hurdlers
British male hurdlers
Commonwealth Games competitors for Guernsey
Athletes (track and field) at the 2018 Commonwealth Games
British Athletics Championships winners
People educated at Elizabeth College, Guernsey
People from Saint Peter Port
Athletes (track and field) at the 2022 Commonwealth Games
Commonwealth Games bronze medallists for Guernsey
Commonwealth Games medallists in athletics
Medallists at the 2022 Commonwealth Games